Aderholt is the Americanized spelling of the North German surname Aderhold. People with this surname include:

 Harry C. Aderholt (1920–2010), American air force brigadier general
 Morrie Aderholt (1915–1955), American baseball player
 Robert Aderholt (born 1965), American politician

References